Elections in Puducherry are conducted to elect the members of Puducherry Vidhan Sabha and the members of the Lok Sabha. There are 30 Vidhan Sabha constituencies and 1 Lok Sabha constituencies in the state.

Pondicherry Representative Assembly elections
After the de facto merger on 1 November 1954 and before the legal integration with the Indian Union on 16 August 1962, general elections were held in 1955 and 1959. So. the first general elections to the Pondicherry Representative Assembly were held in 1955 from July 18 to 23.

Legislative Assembly elections
The Representative Assembly was converted into the Legislative Assembly of Pondicherry on 1 July 1963 as per Section 54(3) of The Union Territories Act, 1963 and its members were deemed to have been elected to the Assembly. The elections for the Puducherry Vidhan Sabha held since 1964.

Performance of difference parties in legislative elections

1964

1969

1974

1977

1980

1985

2001

2006

2011

2016

2021

Lok Sabha elections 
The elections for the Lok Sabha seats in Puducherry held since 1977.

See also 
Electoral history of the Indian National Congress in Puducherry
Electoral history of the Bharatiya Janata Party in Puducherry
Electoral history of the Dravida Munnetra Kazhagam in Puducherry
Electoral history of the All India Anna Dravida Munnetra Kazhagam in Puducherry
Electoral history of the Pattali Makkal Katchi in Puducherry

References